Lisbeth Movin (25 August 1917 – 7 November 2011) was a Danish actress of stage and film best known for her role as Anne, the pastor's wife accused of witchcraft in the film Day of Wrath (1943) directed by Carl Theodor Dreyer. She also appeared as the widow in the screen adaptation of Babette's Feast (1987), directed by Gabriel Axel. She was the mother of actress Lone Lau.

Movin died on 7 November 2011 in Hillerød, Denmark, aged 94.

Partial filmography

Et skud før midnat (1942) - Inge Gram
Søren Søndervold (1942) - Gerda Lundrup
Når man kun er ung (1943) - Aase
Day of Wrath (1943) - Anne Pedersdotter (Absalon's second wife) (uncredited)
Jeg mødte en morder (1943) - Agnete Lønning
Frihed, lighed og Louise (1944) - Gerda
The Red Meadows (1945) - Ruth Isaksen
Lise kommer til Byen (1947) - Scriptgirlen Irma Hansen
Støt står den danske sømand (1948) - Mille Andersen
Hr. Petit (1948) - Marguerite Palsler
Det gælder os alle (1949) - Edith
Den opvakte jomfru (1950) - Frk. Grøndal
Café Paradis (1950) - Fortælleren
Det Sande Ansigt (1951) - Redaktørens datter frk. Sonja
Det store løb (1952) - Gerda Hein
Avismanden (1952) - Dorrit
Hejrenæs (1953) - Ulla Biehle
This Is Life (1953) - Ulla Biehle
En sømand går i land (1954) - Inger Knudsen
Den store gavtyv (1956) - Sekretær
Taxa K 1640 efterlyses (1956) - Else Svendsen
Sønnen fra Amerika (1957) - Ingrid
Det lille hotel (1958) - Pauline Wadenius
Det skete på Møllegården (1960) - Martha
Min kone fra Paris (1961) - Gerda Dreyer
Rikki og mændene (1962) - Peters kone
Sikke'n familie (1963) - Kvinde, hos hvem der bliver begået indbrud
Jensen længe leve (1965) - Fru Landstrup
Den røde kappe (1967) - Bengerd
Mig og min lillebror og Bølle (1968) - (uncredited)
Farlige kys (1972) - Birthes mor
Øjeblikket (1980) - Line's mom
Sidste akt (1987) - Gloria
Babettes gæstebud (1987) - Widow (final film role)

References

External links

Den Danske Film Database
Det Danske Filminstitut

1917 births
2011 deaths
Danish film actresses
Danish film directors
Danish stage actresses
People from Odense